Pearle Maaney (/maːɳi/; born 28 May 1989) is an Indian actress, lyricist, YouTuber, and television presenter who works in Malayalam films. She is known for co-hosting three seasons of the Malayalam dance reality show D 4 Dance. In 2018, Pearle emerged as the first runner-up of the Big Boss Malayalam season 1.

Early life
Pearle Maaney was brought up in a Syro-Malabar Syrian Christian joint family based in Kochi with roots at Chowara. She did her schooling in Holy Angel's Convent Trivandrum and Rajagiri Public School, Kalamassery, and completed her graduation in media studies from Christ University, Bangalore.

Career
Pearle Maaney has anchored over 250 episodes of the music show Yes Jukebox on the Malayalam television channel Yes Indiavision, a subsidiary of Indiavision. She hosted Taste of Kerala, a travel-based cookery show on Amrita TV under the stage name Serah.

In October 2014, she started hosting the dance reality show GumOn D2 on Mazhavil Manorama, replacing host Jewel Mary. Her co-host was Govind Padmasoorya. She also hosted season 2 of the Kaumudy TV programme Cinema Company. In 2018, she contested in the first season of the reality show Bigg Boss on Asianet and emerged as the runner-up. She was the only female contestant to complete 100 days.

Personal life
During season one of the Bigg Boss reality show in 2018, she got involved in a romantic relationship with her co-contestant Srinish Aravind and both of them expressed their wish to get married. On 17 January 2019, Pearle Maaney got engaged to Srinish Aravind at a private ceremony. On 5 May 2019 the couple got married as per Christian customs and on 8 May 2019 they had a Hindu wedding ceremony as well. On 20 March 2021, Pearle gave birth to their daughter, Nila Srinish.

Filmography

Films

Short films

Television

Other roles

Discography

References

External links
 
 
 

Indian VJs (media personalities)
Indian women television presenters
Indian television presenters
Actresses in Malayalam cinema
Indian film actresses
Living people
Actresses in Malayalam television
Indian television actresses
Actresses from Kochi
21st-century Indian actresses
People from Aluva
1989 births
Singers from Kochi
Women musicians from Kerala
21st-century Indian women singers
21st-century Indian singers
Bigg Boss Malayalam contestants
Christ University alumni
Actresses in Hindi cinema
Actresses in Telugu cinema
Actresses in Tamil cinema
Indian YouTubers
People from Ernakulam district
YouTube channels launched in 2011